Bryan Eduard Steven Roy (born 12 February 1970) is a Dutch football manager and a former professional player.

As a player he was a winger and notably played for Ajax, Nottingham Forest and Hertha BSC. His spell at Forest culminated in three Premier League seasons with his debut year resulting in a 3rd-place finish and qualification for the following seasons UEFA Cup. He also played professionally for Foggia. He was capped 32 times by the Netherlands, scoring nine goals.

Following the end of his playing career, Roy moved into coaching and was appointed head coach of Ajax's youth teams – formerly Ajax E1. He was later appointed to a similar position with the Ajax B team in 2010, a position he remained in until 2015.

Club career
Born in Amsterdam, Roy started his professional playing career in Ajax in 1987, winning the UEFA Cup in 1992. In November 1992, Roy was sold to the Italian club Foggia and replaced as leftwinger by Marc Overmars. During his time there, he represented his country at the 1994 World Cup, scoring once as the Netherlands reached the quarter-finals. After the World Cup, he moved to England after Nottingham Forest paid their record fee of £2.5million for his services.

Roy's first season at the City Ground was a success, as he provided a strong partner for Stan Collymore. He helped the newly promoted side finish an impressive third in the Premiership and qualify for the UEFA Cup – the first time Forest had achieved European qualification in the post-Heysel era. Collymore was sold to Liverpool in the summer of 1995, although Forest did reach the UEFA Cup quarter-finals. His first-team opportunities were limited by injury and disappointing form in 1996–97, and Roy decided that he had seen enough of England.

After Forest's 1996–97 season ended in relegation from the Premiership, Roy moved to Germany in a £1.5million switch to Hertha BSC. In 2000, he returned to his homeland and turned out for NAC Breda, where he remained until hanging up his boots in 2002.

International career
Roy picked up 32 international caps for the Netherlands national football team, scoring nine goals. He played at the 1990 and 1994 FIFA World Cups and at UEFA Euro 1992.

International goals

Coaching career
He worked as head coach of the AFC Ajax E-Youth before becoming head coach of Jong Ajax in the summer of 2010.

Controversies
During the COVID-19 pandemic, Roy began spreading numerous conspiracy theories through his Twitter-account, many concerning the pandemic. In October 2020, Roy tweeted threats to journalist Chris Klomp, who has publicly criticised the spreading of COVID-19 conspiracy theories.

In April 2021, Roy replied to a tweet about prime minister Mark Rutte, stating that Rutte would be shot through the head soon. After this Roy was questioned by the police, to whom he declared that he believes Rutte should be executed, because of QAnon-conspiracy theories concerning him. Because of his tweet, Roy was convicted of threatening the prime minister and sentenced to 80 hours of community service under two years' probation. Should Roy not fulfill his community service, he would have to serve 40 days in prison. In case Roy violates the terms of his probation, he will have to serve an additional prison sentence of four weeks. After Roy failed to fulfill his community service, he was arrested to serve 40 days in prison.

Honours
Ajax
 UEFA Cup: 1991–92

References

External links

 

1970 births
Living people
Dutch footballers
Footballers from Amsterdam
Eredivisie players
Expatriate footballers in England
Expatriate footballers in Germany
AFC Ajax players
Calcio Foggia 1920 players
Serie A players
Nottingham Forest F.C. players
Hertha BSC players
NAC Breda players
Netherlands international footballers
Dutch sportspeople of Surinamese descent
1990 FIFA World Cup players
1994 FIFA World Cup players
UEFA Euro 1992 players
Premier League players
Bundesliga players
Dutch expatriate footballers
Expatriate footballers in Italy
Blauw-Wit Amsterdam players
Jong Ajax managers
AFC Ajax non-playing staff
Association football midfielders
UEFA Cup winning players
Dutch football managers